White River High School is a high school in White River, South Dakota, USA. The athletics teams are known as the Tigers.

External links

White River School District 47-1

Public high schools in South Dakota
Mellette County, South Dakota